Adrian Christopher Garvey (born 25 June 1968 in Bulawayo) is a former Zimbabwean-born South African rugby union player. He played as a tighthead prop, and was known for his mobility and ball skills.

Career
Garvey played 1st team rugby at Plumtree High School in Zimbabwe and was selected for the Zimbabwe Schools team in 1986. During his senior career he played for Old Miltonians, Coastal Sharks,  and Newport RFC.

He is one of the few players to have competed at the Rugby World Cup for two countries. He had 10 caps for Zimbabwe, from 1990 to 1993, scoring 2 tries, 8 points in aggregate. He played three games at the 1991 Rugby World Cup, scoring two tries at the 51–12 loss to Scotland, on 9 October 1991.

He later became a South African naturalized citizen and decided to play for South Africa. He had 28 caps, from 1996 to 1999, scoring 4 tries, 20 points in aggregate. He played two times at the Tri Nations, being a member of the winning side in 1998. He was called for the 1999 Rugby World Cup, playing a single game in the 47–3 win over Spain, at Murrayfield, on 10 October 1999. That would be his last game for the Springboks.

Test history

Miscellaneous 
Garvey made the popular move from rugby to mountain biking after retiring from professional sport and participated in the 2011 Absa Cape Epic mountain bike stage race.

See also
List of South Africa national rugby union players – Springbok no. 645

References

External links

1968 births
Living people
Sportspeople from Bulawayo
Alumni of Christian Brothers College, Bulawayo
Zimbabwean people of British descent
Zimbabwean expatriate rugby union players
South African people of British descent
South African rugby union players
Sharks (Currie Cup) players
Sharks (rugby union) players
Golden Lions players
Lions (United Rugby Championship) players
Rugby union props
South Africa international rugby union players
Zimbabwean emigrants to South Africa
Zimbabwean rugby union players
Expatriate rugby union players in Wales
Expatriate rugby union players in South Africa
Zimbabwean expatriate sportspeople in Wales
White Zimbabwean sportspeople
South African expatriate sportspeople in Wales